The South American gray fox (Lycalopex griseus), also known as the Patagonian fox, the chilla or the gray zorro, is a species of Lycalopex, the "false" foxes. It is endemic to the southern part of South America.

Description

The head is reddish-brown flecked with white. The ears are large and there is a distinct black spot on the chin. The pelage is brindled, with agouti guard hairs and a short, dense pale undercoat. The underparts are pale grey. The limbs are tawny and the thighs are crossed by a dark bar. The long, bushy tail has a dark dorsal stripe and dark tip with a paler, mottled underside.

Range and habitat
The South American gray fox is found in the Southern Cone of South America, particularly in Argentina and Chile. Its range comprises a stripe, both sides of the Andes Mountain Range between parallels 17ºS (northernmost Chile) and 54ºS (Tierra del Fuego).

In Argentina, this species inhabits the western semiarid region of the country, from the Andean spurs (ca. 69ºW) to meridian 66ºW. South from the Río Grande, the distribution of the fox widens reaching the Atlantic coast. In Chile, it is present throughout the country. Its presence in Peru has been mentioned; to date, however, there has been no confirmation of it. The South American gray fox was introduced to the Falkland Islands in the late 1920s early 1930s and is still present in quite large numbers on Beaver and Weddell Islands plus several smaller islands.

The South American gray fox occurs in a variety of habitats, from the warm, arid scrublands of the Argentine uplands and the cold, arid Patagonian steppe to the forests of southernmost Chile.

Diet
The diet varies in different parts of its range and at different times of year. It consists mainly of mammals, birds, arthropods, bird eggs, reptiles, fruit and carrion. The main prey items seem to be small mammals, especially rodents. Fruits eaten include Cryptocarya alba, Lithraea caustica and Prosopanche spp.

Reproduction
The South American gray fox breeds in early austral autumn, around March. After a gestation period of two months, two to four kits are born in a den. Not much else is recorded about its lifestyle.

Interaction with environment

Urban
The South American gray fox is a largely solitary animal that has long been hunted for its pelt. The foxes sometimes go near human habitations in search of food such as chickens and sheep, but tend to avoid areas visited by dogs. They are useful in their role as scavengers of carrion and as dispersers of the seeds of the fruit they eat.

Country
Where their ranges overlap, the South American gray fox is in competition with the larger culpeo fox. The former consumes a greater proportion of rodents, and arthropods make a significant portion of its diet, while the culpeo tends to consume larger prey, including the non-native European hare which has been introduced into Chile. These prey animals are partitioned between these two species, with the gray fox being excluded from the best prey territories by the larger culpeo.

References

External links
 
 

South American gray fox
Mammals of the Andes
Mammals of Patagonia
Mammals of Paraguay
Mammals of Brazil
Mammals of Chile
Mammals of Argentina
Mammals of Peru
Mammals of Bolivia
Least concern biota of South America
South American gray fox
Taxa named by John Edward Gray
Fauna of the Valdivian temperate rainforest